Dalibor (Cyrillic script: Далибор) is primarily a male given name of Slavic origin, mostly in Czech Republic. The name is popular in some West Slavic and South Slavic countries, such as the Czech Republic, Slovakia, Serbia, Croatia, and Bosnia and Herzegovina. It means: fighting far away and it is derived from Slavic elements daleko 'far away' and boriti 'to fight'. The first part can be also derived from oddalovat 'to delay', hence it can be also interpreted as 'someone who delays/avoids fighting'.

There is a Bedřich Smetana's eponymous opera, based on Slavonic mythology.

People with this given name
Dalibor Andonov (born 1973), Serbian musician
Dalibor Bagarić (born 1980), Croatian basketball player
Dalibor Brazda (1921–2005), Czech-Swiss composer and conductor
Dalibor Brozović (1927–2009), Croatian linguist
Dalibor Gatarić (born 1986), footballer
Dalibor Dragić (born 1972), Bosnian Serb footballer
 (born 1979), Austrian national trainer of Taekwon-Do
Dalibor Milenković (born 1987), Serbian football goalkeeper
Dalibor Pauletić (born 1978), Croatian football defender
Dalibor Pešterac (born 1976), Serbian footballer
Dalibor Stevanovič (born 1984), Slovenian football player
Dalibor Stojanović (born 1989), Slovenian footballer
Dalibor Cyril Vačkář (1906–1984), Czech composer
Dalibor Veselinović (born 1987), Serbian footballer
Dalibor Vesely (1934–2015), Czech architect
Dalibor Višković (born 1977), Croatian footballer
Dalibor Šamšal (born 1985), Croatian alpine ski racer
 (died 1498), 15th century Czech knight, on whom Smetana based his 1868 opera Dalibor
 (1929–2018), Czech opera singer
Dalibor Janda (born 1953), Czech pop music singer

People with this surname
Jan and Vlasta Dalibor, Czech immigrants to the UK, puppeteers who made the original Pinky and Perky

See also

Slavic names

References

External links
 http://www.behindthename.com/name/dalibor

Slavic masculine given names
Bosnian masculine given names
Croatian masculine given names
Czech masculine given names
Macedonian masculine given names
Montenegrin masculine given names
Slovak masculine given names
Slovene masculine given names
Serbian masculine given names